Richard the Brazen is a 1917 American silent comedy film directed by Perry N. Vekroff and starring Harry T. Morey, Alice Joyce and William Frederic.

Cast
 Harry T. Morey as Richard Williams 
 Alice Joyce as Harriet Renwyk 
 William Frederic as Bill Williams 
 Franklyn Hanna as Jacob Renwyk 
 Robert Kelly as Corrigan 
 Agnes Ayres as Imogene 
 Charles Wellesley as Lord Croyland 
 William Bailey as Fitzgeorge

References

Bibliography
 Donald W. McCaffrey & Christopher P. Jacobs. Guide to the Silent Years of American Cinema. Greenwood Publishing, 1999.

External links
 

1917 films
1917 comedy films
1910s English-language films
American silent feature films
Silent American comedy films
American black-and-white films
Films directed by Perry N. Vekroff
Vitagraph Studios films
1910s American films